The Battle of Jilib was a battle in the 2006 Somali War fought by the Islamic Courts Union (ICU) and affiliated militias against Ethiopian and Transitional Federal Government (TFG) forces for control of the town of Jilib. It began on 31 December 2006, when ICU forces dug in and defended the town to prevent approach to Kismayo, the last stronghold of the ICU.

Background
After the Fall of Mogadishu, roughly 3,000 ICU fighters were said to have fled towards the port city of Kismayo, their last remaining stronghold, 300 miles (500 km) to the south.  In Kismayo, executive leader of the ICU, Sheikh Sharif Sheikh Ahmed was defiant, "We will not run away from our enemies. We will never depart from Somalia. We will stay in our homeland."

In Jilib, the Islamists used bulldozers to prepare trenches and defensive positions. They had about 3,000 fighters and 60 technicals mounted with antiaircraft and antitank guns. Up to 4,700 people fled the area ahead of the fighting.

On Saturday, 30 December, joint Ethiopian-TFG troops had reached the town of Jilib, the last major town on the road to Kismayo. Sheikh Sharif Sheikh Ahmed urged the ICU soldiers to fight on.

Battle
On Sunday, 31 December, fighting began in the thick mango forests near Helashid, 11 miles (18 km) to the northwest of Jilib. Ethiopian MiG fighters, tanks, artillery and mortars struck Islamic positions in the assault. Residents reported the road to Jilib was littered with remote-controlled landmines by the ICU. TFG and Ethiopian forces also attacked Bulobaley, with mortars and rockets.

At approximately 5:00 p.m., a heavy gun battle erupted on the outskirts of Jilib town between Islamic fighters and the Ethiopian-backed interim government troops. Tanks and armored vehicles were reported committed by Ethiopian forces.
The sound of heavy artillery fire could be heard in Jamame town near Jilib, local residents said.

Islamist commander Sheikh Yusuf Hassan said  "The fighting has started. There are heavy losses on both sides", and added that they "are not going to surrender. We will fight to defend Jilib and Kismayo until we die."

Somali Minister of Foreign Affairs Ismail Mohammed Hurreh Buba declared fighting was going well for the government, and the battles around Kismayo might take another two days. He asked for Somalia's coast to be watched for dhows, small boats which might come and try to rescue or reinforce the Islamists in Kismayo. A spokesman said that the United States Fifth Fleet's maritime task force based out of Djibouti was patrolling off the Somali coast to prevent ICU fighters from launching an "attack or to transport personnel, weapons or other material".

During the night, artillery strikes continued, eventually forcing the ICU frontlines to falter. A mutiny within the ICU caused their forces to disintegrate, and abandon both Jilib and Kismayo. At 10 p.m., the sounds of battle died down. By midnight, the ICU front in Jilib had collapsed, and the ICU began to flee. By 2:00 a.m., they had fled from Kismayo. Local militiamen patrolled the streets, and looting began of former ICU property. They were reported to be fleeing towards Ras Kamboni island in southern Somalia, or the Kenyan border.

As a result, the transitional government requested that Kenya seal its border with Somalia.  According to the BBC, Kenyan armored vehicles appeared heading toward the border, though the government made no formal statements.

Aftermath 
With the ICU in a retreat for the Kenyan border, Transitional Federal Government forces slowly advanced towards Kismayo to avoid the many landmines that had been placed. By 1 January 2007, they had reached Kismayo, which was taken without a fight.

Thereafter, operations moved towards securing the borders with Kenya in the provinces of Afmadow and Badhadhe in the Lower Juba region. Ethiopian aircraft and attack helicopters struck the town of Doble (Dhoobley) in Afmadow province, not far from the Kenyan border. The strikes were presumably to hit ICU elements attempting to cross the border. Fighting tailed off after midnight.

On 4 January, reports said ICU troops were split across Afmadow and Badade districts, and possibly concentrated at the former Al-Ittihad Al-Islamiya (AIAI) stronghold of Ras Kamboni. TFG and Ethiopian forces reported taking district capital Afmadow (2 January), and Dhobley along the Kenyan border (3 January), and were presently en route to Badade, the district capital just north of Ras Kamboni.

References

Jilib
Jilib
Jilib
Jilib
Jilib
December 2006 events in Africa
January 2007 events in Africa